"Sweet Porridge", often known in English under the title of "The Magic Porridge Pot", is a folkloric German fairy tale recorded by the Brothers Grimm, as tale number 103 in Grimm's Fairy Tales, in the 19th century.  It is Aarne–Thompson–Uther type 565, the magic mill. Other tales of this type include Why the Sea Is Salt and The Water Mother.

Content
There was a poor but good little girl who lived alone with her mother, and they no longer had anything to eat. So the child went into the forest, and there an aged woman met her who was aware of her sorrow, and presented her with a little pot, which when she said, "Cook, little pot, cook," would cook good, sweet millet porridge, and when she said, "Stop, little pot," it ceased to cook.

The girl took the pot home to her mother, and now they were freed from their poverty and hunger, and ate sweet porridge as often as they chose. Once upon a time when the girl had gone out, her mother said, "Cook, little pot, cook." And it did cook and she ate until she was satisfied, and then she wanted the pot to stop cooking, but did not know the word. So it went on cooking and the porridge rose over the edge, and still it cooked on until the kitchen and whole house were full, and then the next house, and then the whole street, just as if it wanted to satisfy the hunger of the whole world, and there was the greatest distress, but no one knew how to stop it.

At last when only one single house remained, the child came home and just said, "Stop, little pot," and it stopped and gave up cooking, and whosoever wished to return to the town had to eat their way back.

See also

The Sorcerer's Apprentice
The Master and His Pupil
Strega Nona

References

External links

SurLaLune Fairy Tale site, Sweet Porridge
Magic Porridge Pot PDF, Lesson Plans, and Worksheets

Grimms' Fairy Tales
Fiction about magic
ATU 560-649